Hårek Elvenes (born 17 June 1959 in Sortland, Vesterålen) is a Norwegian politician for the Conservative Party.

He was born in Sortland and finished the science branch of Sortland Upper Secondary School in 1978. He was graduated from the Army Engineering College in 1981 and held a diploma in civil engineering. He was an officer in the Norwegian Army (Brigaden i Nord-Norge/Brigade of North-Norway in the engineering company) until 1984.

From 1984 to 1987 he worked in Aker Entreprenør. He graduated with a siv.øk. degree from the Norwegian School of Management in 1991, and took an MBA at the Norwegian School of Economics and Business Administration in 2005. He worked in Veidekke from 1996 to 2005, and is since 2007 the director of Forsvarsbygg Nord-Norge. He lives at Fossum.

He was first elected to Bærum municipal council in 1995, and chaired his local party chapter from 2000 to 2004. He served as a deputy representative to the Norwegian Parliament from the Conservative Party  (Høyre) Akershus during the term 2005–2009 and during the term 2009–2013. From 1 to 17 October 2005, he met in Parliament for Jan Petersen as the Parliament convened before the second cabinet Bondevik withdrew.

References

1959 births
Living people
People from Sortland
Norwegian Army personnel
Conservative Party (Norway) politicians
Members of the Storting
Bærum politicians
BI Norwegian Business School alumni
Norwegian School of Economics alumni
21st-century Norwegian politicians